"Kamikaze" (also titled as "Kamakaze" on clean version) is a song by American rapper Lil Mosey. It is the first track from his debut studio album Northsbest, released on October 19, 2018. Produced by Royce David and Kid Culture, it is built around a sample of "Never Lie" by Immature. Lyrically, Lil Mosey gives the impression that he and his friends are ready for anything. Although not released as a single, the song quickly became a hit upon the release of its music video four days after Northsbest was released.  "Kamikaze" peaked at number 97 on the US Billboard Hot 100 and has since gone on to become one of Mosey's most popular songs.

Music video
Directed by Cole Bennett, the music video was released on Lyrical Lemonade's YouTube channel on October 23, 2020. It sees Lil Mosey on a rooftop. At the end of the video, he narrowly escapes masked gunmen with help from a girl. The music video has amassed over 80 million views to date.

Charts

Certifications

References

2018 songs
Lil Mosey songs
Music videos directed by Cole Bennett
Songs written by Chris Stokes (director)